New Jersey: The Videos is a package featuring all the videos from Bon Jovi's New Jersey album, together with interviews and backstage footage. The video was initially released on VHS in 1989 and on DVD in 2014 as part of the New Jersey: Super Deluxe Edition, along with Access All Areas: A Rock & Roll Odyssey.

Track listing 
 "Bad Medicine" (1st Version)
 "Born To Be My Baby"
 "I'll Be There for You"
 "Lay Your Hands on Me"
 "Living in Sin"
 "Blood on Blood" (live)
 "Bad Medicine" (2nd Version)

Running Time: 45 minutes approx.

Available on the following formats
VHS
Video CD
DVD (as part of the New Jersey 2014 Super Deluxe Edition)

Additional information
New Jersey: The Videos was also available as a double VHS feature which also contains the Access All Areas: A Rock & Roll Odyssey documentary.
Before the start of "Born To Be My Baby" music video, drummer Tico Torres' obscenity is completely bleeped out, however on the Video CD, whilst still bleeped, the word is very much audible.

Certifications

References 

Bon Jovi video albums
1988 video albums
Music video compilation albums
1988 compilation albums